The Twelve Tasks of Asterix (Les Douze travaux d'Astérix) is a 1976 Belgian/French animated feature film based on the Asterix comic book series, and the third in the animated franchise. René Goscinny and Albert Uderzo, the creators of the series, wrote the story and directed the film themselves; with co-direction by Pierre Watrin and the screenplay co-written by Pierre Tchernia, a friend of Goscinny and Uderzo. The film was directed, produced and animated at Goscinny and Uderzo's own animation studio, Studios Idéfix and is the only Asterix animated film that has used the Xerography Process. At the time of its release, the film received mixed reviews since its tone is more cartoony and frequently breaks the fourth wall. Nowadays its reception is more favorable, with it often being cited as one of the best Astérix films, even reaching the status of a cult classic.

It was the only Asterix film (animated or live-action) to be based on an original screenplay rather than on material from any of the comic book stories until the release of Asterix: The Secret of the Magic Potion in 2018. It was later adapted into a comic book as well by Albert Uderzo's brother, Marcel Uderzo, as an illustrated text story book and a series of twelve books for young readers.

Plot 
Following constant defeats by the rebel village of Gaul, the Roman Senate begins to suggest that the Gauls might be gods, due to their apparent invincibility. Julius Caesar, openly disdainful of the suggestion, decides to test the village and meets with their chieftain, Vitalstatistix. Caesar declares that the Gauls must undertake a challenge, inspired by the Twelve Labours of Hercules: the village's best warriors shall perform a set of twelve new tasks, which only gods could carry out successfully. Completion of all the tasks will see Caesar hand over the Roman Empire to them, whereas failing just one task will result in the Gauls surrendering to Rome. Agreeing to the terms, the village assigns Asterix and Obelix to perform the tasks, with Caesar assigning Caius Tiddlus, a Roman man renowned for his honesty, to act as their guide to the tasks and serve as the challenges' referee.

In their first set of challenges, Asterix defeats Asbestos, champion of the Ancient Olympic Games, by beating him in a race, and Cilindric the German in a judo match, by outsmarting his opponent. Obelix defeats Verses the Persian, by managing to throw a javelin further than him. In their next challenge, the pair find themselves crossing a lake that is home to beautiful Sirens, who reside in the centre on the "Isle of Pleasure". Although the Gauls nearly succumb to the women, Obelix comes to his senses when he learns that there are no wild boars for him to hunt and eat, allowing the pair to accomplish the challenge. After surviving the hypnotic gaze of Iris the Egyptian in the fifth task, with Asterix causing him to hypnotise himself, Obelix attempts the sixth task of finishing meals prepared by the Belgian cook Mannekenpix, consuming all the food (which he believes to be his starters).

Following their seventh task of enduring the "Cave of the Beast", the pair attempt the eighth task of getting a permit document from a multi-storey bureaucratic building. After finding it impossible because of the clinically unhelpful people who direct them elsewhere, Asterix beats them at their own game by asking for an imaginary permit. The staff fall victim to their own behaviour, and cause the Prefect to unwittingly hand over what the Gauls came for. The pair continue to complete further challenges. They cross a ravine filled with crocodiles by beating them up, rather than using an invisible tightrope. They answer a riddle by the Old Man of the Mountain, conducted in the form of a washing detergent advertisement. They then endure a night on a plain haunted by ghosts. Asterix gets rid of them by complaining about the noise and convincing the ghosts to shut up.

Asterix and Obelix eventually find themselves in Rome, alongside their fellow villagers, for their final task. Brought to the Circus Maximus, the Gauls fight against gladiators, whom they beat, and defeat various animals sent against them by turning the arena into a modern-day circus. Having succeeded in every task, Caesar agrees that they are gods, giving the Gauls control of the Roman Empire, while retiring to live a quiet and peaceful life with Cleopatra. As a reward for his service, Caius Tiddlus retires to the Isle of Pleasure. As the village celebrates their success, Asterix answers Obelix's question of them really conquering Rome by pointing out that everything that happened to them was a mere cartoon, in which everything is possible. Obelix takes advantage of this and teleports himself and his wild boar meat to the Isle of Pleasure by the High Priestess, along with Caius Tiddlus, to enjoy himself.

Cast

Additional voices
 Original: Roger Carel (Roman Senator #3, Dogmatix), Gisèle Grimm, Nicole Jonesco, Mary Mongourdin, Lawrence Riesner, Jean Stout, Alice Sapritch
 English: Paul Bacon, George Baker, Sean Barrett (Gladiator Trainer, Jailer), Ysanne Churchman, Christina Greatrex (Mrs. Geriatrix, Window 12 Receptionist, Minerva), Alexander John, Barbara Mitchell, Gennie Nevinson, John Ringham, Geoffrey Russell (Cacofonix, Senator #4), Paddy Turner

Home media 
In the United Kingdom, it was watched by 400,000 viewers on television during the first half of 2005, making it the fifth most-watched foreign-language film on UK television during that period.

Notes

In the opening scene at Caesar's senate Brutus is seen around the table playing with a knife of which Caesar says "Brutus, stop playing about with that knife you'll end up hurting somebody", while Brutus is off screen you hear an "ouch" in the background with the next shot of Brutus with a bandage around his finger. This is a reference to Brutus being one of the men who stabbed and killed Caesar.
The scene with the fight in the Native American village during the second task features a cameo appearance by Oumpah-pah, a character created by Goscinny and Uderzo for a separate comic series.
Especially in France and Germany, "The Place that sends you mad" sequence has achieved a strong cult status as a parody of absurd modern-day bureaucracy. In Germany, "Passierschein A38" ("Curfew pass A38") has become a popular slang term for a fictional document to ironically describe absurd bureaucracy. It was also referenced in the second expansion of The Witcher 3: Wild Hunt, Blood and Wine; there, Geralt has to retrieve Permit A38 from a Touissant office, and face unhelpful clerks and confusing architecture.

Comic book and story book adaptations 
In 1976, Albert Uderzo's brother Marcel created a comic book adaptation of the film. This rare album has been translated in various languages, but is unavailable in the regular series. The English translation, only published as part of the once off comic book annual Asterix Annual 1980, was based on the dialogue of the English version of the film and was titled Asterix Conquers Rome. There is also an illustrated book of the film containing the story in text. The story book is more regularly published and more widely translated than the very rare comic book. In addition, there are also twelve rare illustrated text story books for young readers, one for each of the twelve tasks.

References

External links 

 

1976 films
1976 animated films
1970s ghost films
1970s speculative fiction films
Animated films based on comics
Asterix films
Belgian animated films
Bureaucracy in fiction
Films about bureaucracy
Circus films
Asterix Twelve Tasks
1970s French-language films
French alternate history films
French children's films
Cultural depictions of Marcus Junius Brutus
Depictions of Cleopatra on film
Depictions of Julius Caesar on film
Films about gladiatorial combat
Films about crocodilians
Films about Heracles
Films adapted into comics
Films directed by René Goscinny
Films directed by Albert Uderzo
Films about hypnosis
Films scored by Gérard Calvi
Films set in ancient Rome
Self-reflexive films
Surreal comedy films
Teleportation in films
1970s children's animated films
Animated films based on classical mythology
Halas and Batchelor films
Films with screenplays by René Goscinny
Films produced by René Goscinny
Films with screenplays by Pierre Tchernia
1970s French films